Hermitage House was a large Georgian mansion in Castleconnell, County Limerick, Ireland. It was built circa 1790 for George Evans Bruce, a local banker who was subsequently disgraced. It was situated in a spectacular location overlooking the Falls of Doonass on the River Shannon. It became the home of several generations of Lords Massy until 1915, and was subsequently destroyed by fire during the Irish War of Independence. The ruins stood until the 1970s, when they were demolished.

References
Tracy, Frank If those Trees could Speak: the story of an Ascendancy Family in Ireland
Carroll, Joe & Touhy, Pat (1991) Village by Shannon: the Story of Castleconnell and its Hinterland

Buildings and structures in County Limerick